Matthew Zimmerman (December 26, 1934 – June 2022) was a Canadian actor. He was best known as the voice of Alan Tracy in the 1960s television series Thunderbirds and sequel films Thunderbirds Are Go and Thunderbird 6.

Life and career 
Zimmerman was born in Sudbury, Ontario, on December 26, 1934. He was educated in Detroit, Michigan, United States, and started acting at an early age. He attended Bowling Green State University, Ohio, where he was a telecommunications major. Having won a scholarship, he moved to the United Kingdom in 1959 to study drama at the London Academy of Music and Dramatic Art (LAMDA), where he was a contemporary of Ed Bishop.

Zimmerman was cast as Alan Tracy in Thunderbirds after being recommended to producers Gerry and Sylvia Anderson by David Holliday, the voice of Virgil Tracy. In an interview, he remembered of his casting: "They were having great difficulty in casting the part of Alan Tracy as they wanted a certain sound for him ...As I walked in [Sylvia Anderson] looked at me and said, 'Don't talk! Oh, my god, you've got those big eyes and the cleft in the chin and the cheek bones, and if you were blond you'd look very much like Alan.' She said, 'Now, sit down. What's your name again?' And I said, 'My name is Matt Zimmerman and I'm from Detroit, Michigan,' and she said, 'That's the voice!' And that's how I got the job."

Besides voicing Alan, Zimmerman, like other actors on the series, also voiced various minor characters. He made a live-action appearance in one episode of UFO ("Exposed", 1970) among the Andersons' other TV productions.

He also starred as Shooty in The Hitchhiker's Guide to the Galaxy. Other TV appearances include T-Bag, Mike and Angelo, Crazy Like a Fox, Never the Twain, in addition to many commercials, most notably for Wrangler Jeans.

In 2015, Zimmerman appeared in the Thunderbirds revival Thunderbirds Are Go; he played Professor Harold in the episode "Tunnels of Time".

Also a stage actor, he starred in plays such as Annie Get Your Gun, Anything Goes, Once in a Lifetime and West Side Story, and made his most recent West End appearance in Fiddler on the Roof at the Savoy Theatre in London. In 2008, he appeared in the touring cast of Cabaret, taking the role of Herr Schultz.

Zimmerman died in June 2022, at the age of 87.

Filmography 
 1965–1966: Thunderbirds
 1966: A Man for All Seasons
 1966: Thunderbirds Are Go
 1968: Thunderbird 6
 1979: Birth of the Beatles
 1979: Quincy's Quest
 1986: Haunted Honeymoon
 1987: Still Crazy Like a Fox
 1989: The Forgotten
 1995: Margaret's Museum
 2015: Thunderbirds Are Go

References

External links 
 

1934 births
2022 deaths
20th-century Canadian male actors
21st-century Canadian male actors
Male actors from Greater Sudbury
Alumni of the London Academy of Music and Dramatic Art
Bowling Green State University alumni
Canadian expatriates in England
Canadian expatriates in the United States
Canadian male film actors
Canadian male stage actors
Canadian male television actors
Canadian male voice actors